Zhavoronkovo is a rural locality (a selo) in Biysk, Altai Krai, Russia. The population was 113 as of 2013. There are 13 streets.

Geography 
Zhavoronkovo is located 38 km west of Biysk (the district's administrative centre) by road. Savinovo is the nearest rural locality.

References 

Rural localities in Biysk Urban Okrug